Mandirbazar Assembly constituency is a Legislative Assembly constituency of South 24 Parganas district in the Indian State of West Bengal. It is reserved for Scheduled Castes.

Overview
As per order of the Delimitation Commission in respect of the Delimitation of constituencies in the West Bengal, Mandirbazar Assembly constituency is composed of the following:
 Mandirbazar community development block
 Laksmi Narayanpur Dakshin, Laksmi Narayanpur Uttar, Mathurapur Paschim and Mathurapur Purba gram panchayats of Mathurapur I community development block

Mandirbazar Assembly constituency is a part of No. 20 Mathurapur (Lok Sabha constituency).

Members of Legislative Assembly

Election results

Legislative Assembly Election 2021

Legislative Assembly Election 2016

Legislative Assembly Election 2011

Legislative Assembly Elections 1977-2006
In 2006, Dr. Tapati Saha of CPI(M) won the Mandirbazar Assembly constituency defeating Choudhury Mohan Jatua of AITC. Choudhury Mohan Jatua of AITC won in 2001 defeating Nikunja Paik of CPI(M). In 1996, Nikunja Paik of CPI(M) defeated Tapan Sardar of INC. Subhas Roy of CPI(M) won in 1991, 1987 and 1982 defeating Sanat Paik of INC in 1991, Durga Charan Mondal of INC in 1987 and Birendranath Halder of INC in 1982. Renupada Halder of SUCI(C) defeated Subhas Roy of CPI(M) in 1977. The seat did not exist prior to that.

References

Notes

Citations

Assembly constituencies of West Bengal
Politics of South 24 Parganas district